Damir Drinić (born 20 July 1989) is a Serbian former football goalkeeper.

External links
 Profile and stats at Srbijafudbal
 

1989 births
People from Bački Jarak
Living people
Serbian footballers
Association football goalkeepers
FK Vojvodina players
FK Proleter Novi Sad players
FK Mladost Lučani players
FK Donji Srem players
FK Veternik players
OFK Bačka players
Serbian SuperLiga players
Serbian First League players